The 1996 NHL Entry Draft was the 34th NHL Entry Draft. It was held at the Kiel Center in St. Louis, Missouri, on June 22, 1996.

The last active player in the NHL from this draft class was Zdeno Chára, who retired after the 2021–22 season.

Selections by round 
Club teams are located in North America unless otherwise noted.

Round one

Round two

Round three

Round four

Round five

Round six

Round seven

Round eight

Round nine

Draftees based on nationality

See also
 1996–97 NHL season
 List of NHL players

References

 www.hockeydb.com

External links
 prosportstransactions.com: 1996 NHL Entry Draft Pick
 1996 NHL Entry Draft player stats at The Internet Hockey Database

Draft
National Hockey League Entry Draft